Phyllococcus oahuensis was a species of mealybug in the family Pseudococcidae, and the only species in the genus Phyllococcus. It was endemic to Hawaii.

References 

Insects described in 1912
Endemic fauna of Hawaii
Extinct insects since 1500
Taxonomy articles created by Polbot
Pseudococcidae
Monotypic Hemiptera genera